Justin Kunz (born 11 July 1997, in Appenweier) is a German stock car racing driver that currently competes in the NASCAR Whelen Euro Series, driving for Dexwet-df1 Racing in the No. 99 Chevrolet Camaro in the Elite 2 class. He previously competed in the NASCAR Gander Outdoors Truck Series for Jennifer Jo Cobb Racing in 2018.

Racing career

NASCAR Camping World Truck Series
Kunz made his Truck Series debut in 2018, driving the No. 0 Chevrolet Silverado for Jennifer Jo Cobb Racing at Mosport. He started 30th and finished 26th, three laps down.

Whelen Euro Series
In 2016, Kunz began his racing career, driving the No. 44 Chevrolet for CAAL Racing, finishing 10th in the Elite 2 point standings. The following year, Kunz drove the No. 11 Chevrolet for PK Carsport. He finished the season in sixth in the standings with 1 Top 5 and 9 Top 10 finishes. 

For the 2018 season, Kunz drove the No. 46 Chevrolet SS/Ford Mustang for Racing-Total, running double duty and competing in both the Elite 1 and the Elite 2 class. He finished second behind race winner Ulysse Delsaux in the first Elite 2 race at Tours Speedway to score his first podium finish in the series. He would finish the year with 1 podium and 7 Top 10 finishes to finish in ninth in the Elite 2 standings, while he would finish in eleventh in the Elite 1 standings despite not scoring any Top 10 finishes throughout the year.

In 2019, Kunz switched teams again as he moved to Dexwet-df1 Racing. Kunz will be driving solely in the Elite 2 class to partner Ellen Lohr in the No. 99 team.

Motorsports career results

NASCAR
(key) (Bold – Pole position awarded by qualifying time. Italics – Pole position earned by points standings or practice time. * – Most laps led.)

Camping World Truck Series

Whelen Euro Series – Elite 1

Whelen Euro Series – Elite 2

References

External links
 

Living people
1997 births
NASCAR drivers
German racing drivers